The 1926 Michigan Mines football team represented the Michigan College of Mines—now known as Michigan Technological University—as an independent during the 1926 college football season. Michigan Mines compiled a 0–2–1 record.

Schedule

References

Michigan Mines
Michigan Tech Huskies football seasons
College football winless seasons
Michigan Mines football